Azrinaz Mazhar binti Hakim Mazhar formerly Bruneian Pengiran Isteri (Princess Consort) Azrinaz Mazhar (born  28 September 1979) is the Malaysian-born and previously the third wife of Sultan Hassanal Bolkiah, the Sultan of Brunei. She is the second child of Hakim Mazhar Mohd Johar and Fauziah Abdullah Mansoor.

Personal life
Azrinaz was married to Sultan of Brunei, Hassanal Bolkiah, at a private ceremony attended by family members and close friends at the Istana Sultan Brunei (Sultan of Brunei's Palace) in Kuala Lumpur, Malaysia. The marriage was a heavily guarded secret and was only leaked to the press much later by one of the guests. She became the third wife of the king. She was given the title HRH Princess Consort (Duli Yang Teramat Mulia Paduka Seri Pengiran Isteri) Azrinaz Mazhar. On June 1, 2006, she gave birth to Prince Abdul Wakeel. The pregnancy itself was also kept secret. A 21-cannon salute was fired at the vicinity of the Istana Nurul Iman to celebrate the birth. On January 28, 2008, she gave birth to Princess Ameerah Wardatul Bolkiah. Azrinaz was divorced by the Sultan of Brunei through a special announcement on June 16, 2010. Upon the announcement, her royal title, state decorations and medal of honour were withdrawn, but her children retain their titles.

Azrinaz married for a second time on 1 May 2018, to Fairos Khan Abdul Hamid on May 1, 2018. Their solemnisation ceremony took place at her house and attended by family members and close friends.

Children and their date of birth

Honours 

She has been awarded :

Bruneian 
   (20.8.2005, revoked after divorce).

Foreign 
  : Grand Cordon Special Class of the Supreme Order of the Renaissance (13.5.2008).

References

1979 births
Living people
Malaysian people of Malay descent
Bruneian royalty